The Télé Tchad is the national broadcaster of the Central African state of Chad. Télé Tchad broadcasts in Arabic and French. It primarily broadcasts news, educational programming, cultural, religious, and local sport programming 20 hours a day.

History
Télé Tchad began broadcasting on December 10, 1987. Upon its debut, the channel only broadcast four days a week (Thursday through Sunday) and only broadcast in and around N'Djamena through a tower in the Goudji neighborhood. Originally, the station used journalists and personalities from Chadian radio, including Malla Woulou Yakéma, Topono Celestin, and Aldom Nadji Tito. In its early years, the broadcaster received technical support and supplies from West Germany and from Télédiffusion de France.

When Idriss Déby took power in Chad in 1990, he put the broadcaster under the control of the Ministry of Information. 

In 2008 the broadcaster expanded, including stations in Mongo, Borkou, Doba, Biltine and Tibesti as well as a satellite service that was able to broadcast to the Chadian diaspora in Europe, North Africa and elsewhere. 

In 2012, the broadcaster had a new headquarters built on Avenue Charles de Gaulle in N'Djamena at the cost of 19 billion CFA francs. The building, which houses both Tele Tchad and Radiodiffusion Nationale Tchadienne, is 70 meters tall and includes the broadcast tower.

Controversies

Due to the ongoing human rights situation in Chad, the national broadcaster is seen as favoring the government. Reporters Without Borders frequently lists Chad near the bottom of its list of World Press Freedom rankings, due to "Violence, arbitrary arrest and cyber-censorship for journalists in Chad".

See also
 Media of Chad
 Telecommunications in Chad

References

External links
La Télé-Tchad, la chouchou de Deby
Lyngsat Address

Television networks
Publicly funded broadcasters
Television stations in Chad
Television channels and stations established in 1987
State media